Chakwath is a village in Bihiya block of Bhojpur district, Bihar, India. As of 2011, its population was 4,964, in 760 households.

References 

Villages in Bhojpur district, India